Brunetta is an Italian surname. Notable people with the surname include:

Eugenio Brunetta d'Usseaux (1857–1919), Italian nobleman
Juan Brunetta (footballer) (born 1997), Argentine professional footballer
Juan Guillermo Brunetta (born 1975), Argentine professional racing cyclist
Mario Brunetta (born 1967), Canadian ice hockey player
Renato Brunetta (born 1950), Italian economist and politician

See also 
 Bruni (surname)

Italian-language surnames